Nepalese protests may refer to:
 Nepalese democracy movement
 1979 Nepalese student protests
 Guthi Bill
 2020–2021 Nepalese protests
 2022 Nepalese protest